Sakineh Peri (born 1902), was an Iranian physician.

She became the first female physician and surgeon in Iran in 1934.

References

1902 births
20th-century Iranian physicians
20th-century Iranian women
Iranian surgeons
People of Pahlavi Iran
Year of death missing